William Venable may refer to:
William W. Venable (1880–1948), U.S. Representative from Mississippi
William Henry Venable (1836–1920), American educator
Will Venable, American baseball player
Max Venable (William McKinley Venable), American baseball player

See also
 Venable, listing people sharing this surname